The 2022–23 Northern Michigan Wildcats men's ice hockey season will be the 47th season of play for the program. They represent Northern Michigan University in the 2022–23 NCAA Division I men's ice hockey season and for the 25th season in the Central Collegiate Hockey Association (CCHA). The Wildcats will be coached by Grant Potulny, in his sixth season, and play their home games at Berry Events Center.

Season

Departures

Recruiting

Roster
As of September 8, 2022.

Standings

Schedule and results

|-
!colspan=12 style=";" | Regular Season

|-
!colspan=12 style=";" |

Scoring statistics

Goaltending statistics

Rankings

References

2022-23
Northern Michigan Wildcats
Northern Michigan Wildcats
Northern Michigan Wildcats
Northern Michigan Wildcats